This was a new event in 2013.

Mandy Minella won the tournament, defeating Gabriela Dabrowski in the final, 6–3, 6–3.

Seeds

Main draw

Finals

Top half

Bottom half

References 
 Main draw

South Seas Island Resort Women's Pro Classic - Singles